Marlene Ambo-Rasmussen (born 14 March 1986 in Magleby on Langeland) is a Danish politician, who is a member of the Folketing for the Venstre political party. She has a background as a disability assistant. She was elected into parliament in the 2019 Danish general election.

Political career
Ambo-Rasmussen first ran in the 2015 Danish general election, though did not get elected. She received 2,239 personal votes, which got her elected as a substitute member of the Folketing in the 2015-2019 term, though she was not called upon during the term. In the 2019 election she received 6,312 personal votes, securing her a seat in the Folketing.

External links 
 Biography on the website of the Danish Parliament (Folketinget)

References 

Living people
1986 births
People from Langeland Municipality
21st-century Danish women politicians
Venstre (Denmark) politicians
Women members of the Folketing
Members of the Folketing 2019–2022